Thyroid cancer is cancer that develops from the tissues of the thyroid gland. It is a disease in which cells grow abnormally and have the potential to spread to other parts of the body. Symptoms can include swelling or a lump in the neck. Cancer can also occur in the thyroid after spread from other locations, in which case it is not classified as thyroid cancer.

Risk factors include radiation exposure at a young age, having an enlarged thyroid, family history and obesity. The four main types are papillary thyroid cancer, follicular thyroid cancer, medullary thyroid cancer, and anaplastic thyroid cancer. Diagnosis is often based on ultrasound and fine needle aspiration. Screening people without symptoms and at normal risk for the disease is not recommended as of 2017.

Treatment options may include surgery, radiation therapy including radioactive iodine, chemotherapy, thyroid hormone, targeted therapy, and watchful waiting. Surgery may involve removing part or all of the thyroid. Five-year survival rates are 98% in the United States.

Globally as of 2015, 3.2 million people have thyroid cancer. In 2012, 298,000 new cases occurred. It most commonly is diagnosed between the ages of 35 and 65. Women are affected more often than men. Those of Asian descent are more commonly affected. Rates have increased in the last few decades, which is believed to be due to better detection. In 2015, it resulted in 31,900 deaths.

Signs and symptoms

Most often, the first symptom of thyroid cancer is a nodule in the thyroid region of the neck. However, up to 65% of adults have small nodules in their thyroids, but typically under 10% of these nodules are found to be cancerous. Sometimes, the first sign is an enlarged lymph node. Later symptoms that can be present are pain in the anterior region of the neck and changes in voice due to an involvement of the recurrent laryngeal nerve.

Thyroid cancer is usually found in a euthyroid patient, but symptoms of hyperthyroidism or hypothyroidism may be associated with a large or metastatic, well-differentiated tumor. Thyroid nodules are of particular concern when they are found in those under the age of 20. The presentation of benign nodules at this age is less likely, thus the potential for malignancy is far greater.

Causes
Thyroid cancers are thought to be related to a number of environmental and genetic predisposing factors, but significant uncertainty remains regarding their causes.

Environmental exposure to ionizing radiation from both natural background sources and artificial sources is suspected to play a significant role, and significantly increased rates of thyroid cancer occur in those exposed to mantlefield radiation for lymphoma, and those exposed to iodine-131 following the Chernobyl, Fukushima, Kyshtym, and Windscale nuclear disasters. Thyroiditis and other thyroid diseases also predispose to thyroid cancer.

Genetic causes include multiple endocrine neoplasia type 2, which markedly increases rates, particularly of the rarer medullary form of the disease.

Diagnosis

After a thyroid nodule is found during a physical examination, a referral to an endocrinologist or a thyroidologist may occur. Most commonly, an ultrasound is performed to confirm the presence of a nodule and assess the status of the whole gland. Some ultrasound results may report a TI-RADS or TIRADS score to categorize the risk of malignancy. Measurement of thyroid stimulating hormone,  free and/or total triiodothyronine (T3) and thyroxine (T4) levels, and antithyroid antibodies will help decide if a functional thyroid disease such as Hashimoto's thyroiditis is present, a known cause of a benign nodular goiter. a thyroid scan, performed often in conjunction with a radioactive iodine uptake test may be used to determine whether a nodule is "hot" or "cold" which may help to make a decision whether to perform a biopsy of the nodule. Measurement of calcitonin is necessary to exclude the presence of medullary thyroid cancer. Finally, to achieve a definitive diagnosis before deciding on treatment, a fine needle aspiration cytology test may be performed and reported according to the Bethesda system.

After diagnosis, to understand potential for spread of disease, or for follow up monitoring after surgery, a whole body I-131 or I-123 radioactive iodine scan may be performed.

In adults without symptoms, screening for thyroid cancer is not recommended.

Classification

Thyroid cancers can be classified according to their histopathological characteristics. These variants can be distinguished (distribution over various subtypes may show regional variation):
 Papillary thyroid cancer (75 to 85% of cases) – is more often diagnosed in young females compared to other types of thyroid cancer and has an excellent prognosis. It may occur in women with familial adenomatous polyposis and in patients with Cowden syndrome. A follicular variant of papillary thyroid cancer also exists.
 Newly reclassified variant: noninvasive follicular thyroid neoplasm with papillary-like nuclear features is considered an indolent tumor of limited biologic potential.
 Follicular thyroid cancer (10 to 20% of cases) – occasionally seen in people with Cowden syndrome. Some include Hürthle cell carcinoma as a variant and others list it as a separate type.
 Medullary thyroid cancer (5 to 8% of cases) – cancer of the parafollicular cells, often part of multiple endocrine neoplasia type 2.
 Poorly differentiated thyroid cancer
 Anaplastic thyroid cancer (1 to 2%) is not responsive to treatment and can cause pressure symptoms.
 Others
 Thyroid lymphoma
 Squamous cell thyroid carcinoma
 Sarcoma of thyroid
 Hürthle cell carcinoma

The follicular and papillary types together can be classified as "differentiated thyroid cancer". These types have a more favorable prognosis than the medullary and undifferentiated types.
 Papillary microcarcinoma is a subset of papillary thyroid cancer defined as a nodule measuring less than or equal to 1 cm. 43% of all thyroid cancers and 50% of new cases of papillary thyroid carcinoma are papillary microcarcinoma. Management strategies for incidental papillary microcarcinoma on ultrasound (and confirmed on FNAB) range from total thyroidectomy with radioactive iodine ablation to lobectomy or observation alone. Harach et al. suggest using the term "occult papillary tumor" to avoid giving patients distress over having cancer.  Woolner et al.  first arbitrarily coined the term "occult papillary carcinoma", in 1960, to describe papillary carcinomas ≤ 1.5 cm in diameter.

Staging
Cancer staging is the process of determining the extent of the development of a cancer. The TNM staging system is usually used to classify stages of cancers, but not of the brain.

Metastases
Detection of differentiated thyroid cancer metastasis may be detected by performing a full-body scintigraphy using iodine-131.

Spread
Thyroid cancer can spread directly, via lymphatics or blood. Direct spread occurs through infiltration of the surrounding tissues. The tumor infiltrates into infrahyoid muscles, trachea, oesophagus, recurrent laryngeal nerve, carotid sheath, etc. The tumor then becomes fixed. Anaplastic carcinoma spreads mostly by direct spread, while papillary carcinoma spreads so the least. Lymphatic spread is most common in papillary carcinoma. Cervical lymph nodes become palpable in papillary carcinoma even when the primary tumor is unpalpable. Deep cervical nodes, pretracheal, prelaryngeal, and paratracheal groups of lymph nodes are often affected. The lymph node affected is usually the same side as that of the location of the tumor. Blood spread is also possible in thyroid cancers, especially in follicular and anaplastic carcinoma. The tumor emboli do angioinvasion of lungs; end of long bones, skull, and vertebrae are affected. Pulsating metastases occur because of their increased vascularity.

Treatment
Thyroidectomy and dissection of central neck compartment is the initial step in treatment of thyroid cancer in the majority of cases. Thyroid-preserving operations may be applied in cases, when thyroid cancer exhibits low biological aggressiveness (e.g. well-differentiated cancer, no evidence of lymph-node metastases, low MIB-1 index, no major genetic alterations like BRAF mutations, RET/PTC rearrangements, p53 mutations etc.) in patients younger than 45 years.
If the diagnosis of well-differentiated thyroid cancer (e.g. papillary thyroid cancer) is established or suspected by FNA, then surgery is indicated, whereas watchful waiting strategy is not recommended in any evidence-based guidelines.  Watchful waiting reduces overdiagnosis and overtreatment of thyroid cancer among old patients.

Radioactive iodine-131 is used in people with papillary or follicular thyroid cancer for ablation of residual thyroid tissue after surgery and for the treatment of thyroid cancer. Patients with medullary, anaplastic, and most Hurthle-cell cancers do not benefit from this therapy.

External irradiation may be used when the cancer is unresectable, when it recurs after resection, or to relieve pain from bone metastasis.

Sorafenib and lenvatinib are approved for advanced metastatic thyroid cancer. Numerous agents are in phase II and III clinical trials.

Post surgical monitoring for recurrence or metastasis may include routine ultrasound, CT scans, FDG-PET/CT, radioactive iodine whole body scans, and routine laboratory blood tests for changes in thyrogolubin, thyroglobuilin antibodies, or calcitonin, depending on the variant of thyroid cancer.

Prognosis

The prognosis of thyroid cancer is related to the type of cancer and the stage at the time of diagnosis.  For the most common form of thyroid cancer, papillary, the overall prognosis is excellent. Indeed, the increased incidence of papillary thyroid carcinoma in recent years is likely related to increased and earlier diagnosis. One can look at the trend to earlier diagnosis in two ways. The first is that many of these cancers are small and not likely to develop into aggressive malignancies. A second perspective is that earlier diagnosis removes these cancers at a time when they are not likely to have spread beyond the thyroid gland, thereby improving the long-term outcome for the patient. No consensus exists at present on whether this trend toward earlier diagnosis is beneficial or unnecessary.

The argument against early diagnosis and treatment is based on the logic that many small thyroid cancers (mostly papillary) will not grow or metastasize. This view holds the overwhelming majority of thyroid cancers are overdiagnosed that is, will never cause any symptoms, illness, or death for the patient, even if nothing is ever done about the cancer.  Including these overdiagnosed cases skews the statistics by lumping clinically significant cases in with apparently harmless cancers.  Thyroid cancer is incredibly common, with autopsy studies of people dying from other causes showing that more than one-third of older adults technically have thyroid cancer, which is causing them no harm.  Detecting nodules that might be cancerous is easy, simply by feeling the throat, which contributes to the level of overdiagnosis. Benign (noncancerous) nodules frequently co-exist with thyroid cancer; sometimes, a benign nodule is discovered, but surgery uncovers an incidental small thyroid cancer. Increasingly, small thyroid nodules are discovered as incidental findings on imaging (CT scan, MRI, ultrasound) performed for another purpose; very few of these people with accidentally discovered, symptom-free thyroid cancers will ever have any symptoms, and treatment in such patients has the potential to cause harm to them, not to help them.

Thyroid cancer is three times more common in women than in men, but according to European statistics, the overall relative 5-year survival rate for thyroid cancer is 85% for females and 74% for males.

The table below highlights some of the challenges with decision making and prognostication in thyroid cancer. While general agreement exists that stage I or II papillary, follicular, or medullary cancer have  good prognoses,  when evaluating a small thyroid cancer to determine which ones will grow and metastasize and which will not is not possible. As a result, once a diagnosis of thyroid cancer has been established (most commonly by a fine needle aspiration),  a total thyroidectomy likely will be performed.

This drive to earlier diagnosis has also manifested itself on the European continent by the use of serum calcitonin measurements in patients with goiter to identify patients with early abnormalities of the parafollicular or calcitonin-producing cells within the thyroid gland. As multiple studies have demonstrated, the finding of an elevated serum calcitonin is associated with the finding of a medullary thyroid carcinoma in as high as 20% of cases.

In Europe where the threshold for thyroid surgery is lower than in the United States, an elaborate strategy that incorporates serum calcitonin measurements and stimulatory tests for calcitonin has been incorporated into the decision to perform a thyroidectomy; thyroid experts in the United States, looking at the same data, have for the most part not incorporated calcitonin testing as a routine part of their evaluations, thereby eliminating a large number of thyroidectomies and the consequent morbidity. The European thyroid community has focused on prevention of metastasis from small medullary thyroid carcinomas; the North American thyroid community has focused more on prevention of complications associated with thyroidectomy (see American Thyroid Association guidelines below). 
As demonstrated in the table below, individuals with stage III and IV disease have a significant risk of dying from thyroid cancer. While many present with widely metastatic disease, an equal number evolve over years and decades from stage I or II disease. Physicians who manage thyroid cancer of any stage recognize that a small percentage of patients with low-risk thyroid cancer will progress to metastatic disease.

Improvements have been made in thyroid cancer treatment during recent years. The identification of some of the molecular or DNA abnormalities  has led to the development of therapies that target these molecular defects. The first of these agents to negotiate the approval process is vandetanib, a tyrosine kinase inhibitor that targets the RET proto-oncogene, two subtypes of the vascular endothelial growth factor receptor, and the epidermal growth factor receptor.  More of these compounds are under investigation and are likely to make it through the approval process. For differentiated thyroid carcinoma, strategies are evolving to use selected types of targeted therapy to increase radioactive iodine uptake in papillary thyroid carcinomas that have lost the ability to concentrate iodide. This strategy would make possible the use of radioactive iodine therapy to treat "resistant" thyroid cancers. Other targeted therapies are being evaluated, making  life extension possible over the next 5–10 years for those with stage III and IV thyroid cancer.

Prognosis is better in younger people than older ones.

Prognosis depends mainly on the type of cancer and cancer stage.

Epidemiology
Thyroid cancer, in 2010, resulted in 36,000 deaths globally up from 24,000 in 1990.  Obesity may be associated with a higher incidence of thyroid cancer, but this relationship remains the subject of much debate.

Thyroid cancer accounts for less than 1% of cancer cases and deaths in the UK. Around 2,700 people were diagnosed with thyroid cancer in the UK in 2011, and around 370 people died from the disease in 2012.

However, in South Korea, thyroid cancer was the 5th most prevalent cancer, which accounted for 7.7% of new cancer cases in 2020.

Notable cases
 Jennifer Grey American Actress
 Karen Smyers American swimmer
 Emre Can, German footballer
 Joe Piscopo, American actor
 Sofía Vergara, American actress
 Rod Stewart, British singer
 Julia Volkova, Russian singer
 Daniel Snyder, American owner of the Washington Football Team
 Danny New, co-host of Daytime for WFLA and previous host of Mass Appeal on WWLP.
 Erica Lugo, a coach on Biggest Loser television show.
 Jerry Dipoto, former Major League Baseball pitcher
 William Rehnquist, Chief Justice of the United States (1986–2005) died September 3, 2005, from anaplastic thyroid cancer
 Esther Grace Earl, Avid Nerdfighter (August 3, 1994 – August 25, 2010) Died from papillary thyroid cancer that spread to the lungs
 Uhm Jung-hwa,  South Korean singer, actress and dancer 
 Lee Moon-sae, South Korean ballad singer 
 Vladimir Putin, president of Russia

References

External links 

 
 Management Guidelines for Patients with Thyroid Nodules and Differentiated Thyroid Cancer—The American Thyroid Association Guidelines Taskforce (2015)

 
Endocrine diseases
Wikipedia medicine articles ready to translate
Thyroid disease